Car Guy Racing is an auto racing team based in Shizuoka Prefecture, Japan, established by Takeshi Kimura in 2016. The team currently competes in Super GT under the Pacific hololive Car Guy Racing banner and in the European Le Mans Series under collaboration with Kessel Racing, fielding the No. 9 Ferrari 488 GT3 Evo in the GT300 class and the No. 57 Ferrari 488 GTE Evo in the LMGTE class respectively. Car Guy is also scheduled to compete in GT World Challenge Asia with a Ferrari 488 GT3 Evo in the GT3 class. 

The team qualified for the 2019 24 Hours of Le Mans race in the GTE Am category using a Ferrari 488.

History
Car Guy Racing first entered into motorsport in 2016 when the team entered a Lamborghini Huracán GT3 driven by team owner Takeshi Kimura, Manabu Orido and Malaysian driver Afiq Yazid in the fifth round of that year's Super Taikyu championship, achieving a third place finish on the team's debut. Car Guy later moved to the Super Car Race championship the following year with Car Guy acting as one of the series' primary partners for the season. The team also competed as a wildcard in the Blancpain GT Asia round at Fuji Speedway that year, securing an overall victory with drivers Naoki Yokomizo and Kei Cozzolino.

In 2018, the team first entered into the Super GT championship where they became one of the first teams to compete with the new Honda NSX GT3 in the GT300 class with Kimura and Cozzolino acting as the team's primary drivers. The team finished 26th out of 29 entrants in the team standings with a best finish of 15th in the opening round at Okayama. Later that year, the team competed in the Asian Le Mans Series with a Ferrari 488 GT3 in the GT class with Kimura, Cozzolino, and British driver James Calado driving for the team. Car Guy went on to dominate the GT class that year, scoring a total of 101 points after winning all four races and gaining an additional point for pole position at their home circuit Fuji Speedway.

In 2023 Car Guy have switched to a new Ferrari 296 GT3 for GT World Challenge Asia, but will continue to campaign various versions of the Ferrari 488 with confirmed entry to Asian Le Mans Series and a "likely" entry to European Le Mans Series.

Results

Asian Le Mans Series results

Complete Super GT results
(key) (Races in bold indicate pole position) (Races in italics indicate fastest lap)

External links 
 Official website

References

Auto racing teams established in 2016
Japanese auto racing teams
24 Hours of Le Mans teams
Super GT teams
Ferrari in motorsport